Michel Pécheux (24 May 1911 – 29 August 1985) was a French fencer.

Pécheux competed in the Men's Team Épée event at the 1936 Summer Olympics, winning a bronze medal for France.  He was a team gold medalist at London in 1948, once again in épée.

References

External links
Olympic medals

1911 births
1985 deaths
French male épée fencers
Olympic fencers of France
Fencers at the 1936 Summer Olympics
Fencers at the 1948 Summer Olympics
Olympic gold medalists for France
Olympic bronze medalists for France
Olympic medalists in fencing
Medalists at the 1936 Summer Olympics
Medalists at the 1948 Summer Olympics